The 2023 NCAA Division I Women's Swimming and Diving Championships were contested March 15-18, 2022 at the 41st annual NCAA-sanctioned swim meet to determine the team and individual national champions of Division I women's collegiate swimming and diving in the United States.

This year's events were hosted by the University of Tennessee at the Allan Jones Aquatic Center in Knoxville, Tennessee.

Team standings

Note: Top 10 only
(H) = Hosts
(DC) = Defending champions

Swimming results 
Full Results

Diving results

See also
List of college swimming and diving teams

References

NCAA Division I Swimming And Diving Championships
NCAA Division I Women's Swimming and Diving Championships